The Utah Legal Tender Act, passed March 10, 2011, recognizes gold and silver coins issued by the United States as legal tender in the state of Utah. This includes allowing the state of Utah to pay off debts in gold and silver and allowing individuals to transact in gold and silver coins without paying state capital gains tax, among other provisions. The bill was introduced as HB317 by State Representative Brad J. Galvez.

In 2020, KSL-TV in Salt Lake City, Utah reported 25-50% of small business in Utah were accepting independently produced Goldback currency which had been created in the aftermath of the 2011 law.

The law does not violate the constitution of the USA as the constitution allows individual states to make gold and silver legal tender, affording the same power to the federal government but granting the federal government the additional power to issue paper money.

References

Utah law
2011 in American law
Gold standard